ŽRK Pelister 2012 (WHC Pelister 2012) is a Macedonian women's handball club from Bitola, North Macedonia. The team was rebuilt after 15 years in 2014-15 season. The team currently competes in the Macedonian women's First League of Handball. ŽRK Pelister 2012 has participated twice in the EHF Challenge Cup.

Champions
 1984

CHURLEVSKI Arena 

Sports hall "Mladost" (Macedonian: Спортска сала „Младост“) is a multi-purpose sports arena located in Bitola, North Macedonia. It was built in 1975 by the citizens of Bitola and is mainly used for handball by RK Pelister and RK Bitola, and for basketball by KK Pelister. There is also room for bowling and table tennis plus it has been used for concerts. The Arena hosted the 2007 Macedonian Basketball Cup. This sports hall was the largest on the territory of North Macedonia before the construction of the Boris Trajkovski Sports Center in Skopje.

On 21 July 2009, the arena is undergoing renovation. A new parquet floor will be installed along with new seats. The locker rooms will also be updated to meet EHF standards. Total cost of the project is about €30,000.

In January 2017, renovation of interior of the hall started. The renovation covered the floor, the stands, a new score board and a new heating system. The first match in the renovated arena was played on April 6, 2017 with the match between RK Pelister and RK Metalurg in the second round of the handball Super League play-off.

At the end of July 2018, the name of the hall was changed to "Boro Churlevski", in honor of the late Boro Churlevski, a former handball player from Bitola.Churlevski Arena has a capacity of 4000 sits.

European record

Team

Current squad 

Squad for the 2018–19 season

Goalkeepers
  Ivana Bogoevska
  Slobodanka Kiceska
  Jovana Ristova

Wingers
RW
  Monika Bosilkovska
  Dominika Nikoloska
LW 
  Kristina Naumovska
  Sara Ilievska
Line Players 
  Anastasija Kajcevska
  Natalija Diskovska

Back players
LB
  Angela Jankulovska
  Arijona Raif
CB 
  Frosina Apostolovska
  Iva Bozhinoska
RB
  Sabina Etemovska
  Sara Rujanovska

Transfers
Transfers for the 2018–19 season 

Joining
  Anastasija Nikolovska (LW) (from  HC Vardar)
  Iva Bozhinoska (CB) (from  HC Vardar)

Leaving
  Gabriela Velickovska (LB) (to  Le Pouzin Handball 07)
 Vaska Gligorijadis (RW) (to  ŽRK Kumanovo)

References

External links
 Official website
 RFM Profile

Handball clubs in North Macedonia
Sport in Bitola